Vasily Sopromadze Platonovich (born 9 December 1963) is a business magnate and philanthropist. He is the founder of Fresco retail group that operates a chain of supermarkets across Georgia.

Education

After being seconded abroad in 1985, Vasily Sopromadze had graduated from The Leningrad Engineering-Economic Institute named after Palmiro Tolyatti.

Life and Business career

From the years 1985 to 1987 Vasily Sopromadze has passed a way from a foreman up to the Chief of a Site at Trust No 6 Glavleningradstroy. In 1987 he was appointed the Chief Engineer of the Fourth Research-and-Production Enterprise of Association "Restorer" and in 1988 was elected as its Director. In 1989 Vasily Sopromadze has established and headed "ITUS" (ITaly rUSsia) until 1996.
Between 1996 and 1998 he has supervised a number of large enterprises of Georgia. From 1998 Vasily Sopromadze founded and headed Corporation S LLC, leading property development corporation in Saint-Petersburg, Russian Federation, developing extensive residential and commercial buildings predominantly in Tsentralny.

In 2012 Vasily Sopromadze founded a supermarket chain "Fresco" in Georgia. Fresco has eight locations across Georgia and many areas of Tbilisi, such as Varketili, Mukhiani, Ortachala, Saburtalo, Chugureti and Sanzona.
In 2015, company planned to develop and launch four more supermarkets.

Family life

Vasily Sopromadze is married with two children, son and a daughter.

Politics

Between 1994 and 1996 Vasily Sopromadze was a member of a number of working groups of Expert Council at the Government of the Russian Federation.

Honours

The active member of The Russian Academy of Science, culture and public work, the academician.
The Honorable Builder of Russia.
The Knight of Saint George Award of 1-st degree.

References 

1963 births
Living people